There are two communities in Florida that use the name Newport:

 Newport, Monroe County, Florida
 Newport, Wakulla County, Florida